The Witness for the Defense is a 1919 American silent drama film directed by George Fitzmaurice and starring Elsie Ferguson, Warner Oland, and Wyndham Standing.

Production background
The film is based on the 1913 novel The Witness for the Defence by A. E. W. Mason. Mason's story was performed as a play on Broadway in 1911 and starred Ethel Barrymore.

The film is the earliest of prolific director George Fitzmaurice's to survive and is likewise the only silent film of Elsie Ferguson that remains extant. The film is also the first feature length film art direction credit for William Cameron Menzies.

Cast

Preservation status
A print of The Witness for the Defense was discovered in the Gosfilmofond archive in Moscow.

References

External links

The Witness for the Defense as restored and presented by the University of North Dakota (with stills and clips from the movie)

1919 films
American silent feature films
1919 drama films
Films directed by George Fitzmaurice
Silent American drama films
Films based on British novels
American black-and-white films
1910s rediscovered films
Films with screenplays by Ouida Bergère
1910s American films
1910s English-language films